The Women's Rugby Bundesliga is the top national competition for women's rugby union football clubs in Germany. The competition started in 1988 and the most successful teams are the SC Neuenheim, FC St. Pauli and Heidelberger RK.

In October 2009, it was decided to continue with the development plan for the women's Bundesliga. From 2013, the league is scheduled to have eight clubs in a single-division format, from 2016 it is to be expanded to ten clubs.

Championship finals

Source:

Placings
Recent placings in the Rugby Bundesliga:

References

External links
 Official site
 Scrum.de: Results archive

Germany
Rugby-Bundesliga
1988 establishments in West Germany
Sports leagues established in 1988
Women's sports leagues in Germany